Adobe Muse is a discontinued no code offline website builder used to create fixed, fluid, or adaptive websites, without the need to write code. Adobe Muse is one of the early pioneer of current 2020s software design trend of no code movement. It generates static pages, but does not manage hosting. Users can add more advanced functionality such as blogging and E-commerce to their website with plugins created by third-party developers. This application is available to download through Adobe's Creative Cloud subscription. Technical support for Muse ended on March 26, 2020. The final feature improvement release was made available on March 26, 2018.

Overview

Themes 
Adobe Muse themes are created inside Adobe Muse and shared as a .muse file. Themes do not require any configuration or setup to get running. Since Adobe Muse generates static HTML files, the files can be exported to the browser for testing without needing to be hosted. Because of its static nature, however, themes cannot be applied to existing content and content cannot be imported into a theme. Since themes are created inside Adobe Muse, they do not require knowledge of any code. Free starter designs are offered on Adobe Muse. Themes can be viewed via a built in 'Preview' option that allows users to preview their website in the application. Users can also temporarily host their website in Business Catalyst for free as part of the Creative Cloud subscription.

Widgets 
Adobe Muse widgets are written in an XML format called MuCow (Muse Configurable Options Widget). Widgets are placed onto a Muse canvas and their content is embedded directly into the HTML of the site. Widgets have made it possible for Muse users to add blogs, eCommerce, animations, etc. to a Muse website.

History 
When Muse was initially created in May 2012, it was made to generate websites for 3 types of devices (Desktop, Tablet, and Mobile). Using viewports and redirects, a Muse website users would access a site that was built specifically for their generic device type. In May 2012, fluid design was just beginning to be used mainstream. After years of requests, Muse was made capable to build fully responsive content in its 2015.1 release.

Release history

See also
Adobe Dreamweaver
CSS framework

References

External links 
 

Adobe software
Discontinued Adobe software
MacOS software
Responsive web design
Web development software
Web design
Windows software
2012 software